The Dove was a 196 ton propeller-driven steamboat built in Portland, Oregon in 1889.  Launched as Typhoon, she operated in the late 1890s and early 1900s as part of the Puget Sound Mosquito Fleet and also for a time on Grays Harbor.  She was later converted into a tug.

Construction

Dove was originally built in 1889 in Portland, Oregon for ferry service under J.B. Montgomery, and launched under the name Typhoon.

Operations
In 1891, J.B. Montgomery sold Typhoon to George Emerson at Grays Harbor, who in turn sold the vessel a short time later to C.O. Lorenz, who brought her to Puget Sound and placed her on the Tacoma-Henderson Bay route.  In 1903, she was acquired by Matthew McDowell, who rebuilt the vessel and placed her on the Seattle-Tacoma-East Pass route under the name Dove.

Later operations
In about 1916, McDowell sold Dove to Washington Tug & Barge Co. of Seattle, and Dove thereafter served as a tug.

See also
Matthew McDowell

Notes

Steamboats of Washington (state)
Propeller-driven steamboats of Washington (state)
Steamboats of the Columbia River
History of Washington (state)
1889 ships